The Duluth Curling Club (DCC) is a curling club located in Duluth, Minnesota, United States. DCC is the curling club with the second largest membership in the United States.

History
The Duluth Curling Club was organized in 1891. The original building was a tent between two retaining walls on East Superior Street downtown, but it was carried away by a blizzard that winter.  Another building at Wallace and Arrowhead was then converted for use, until a structure was purpose-built in 1897 at 14th Avenue East and the waterfront. The Club has been located at the Duluth Entertainment Convention Center (DECC) since 1976.

The club hosted the U.S. Grand Prix in December 2016, a made-for-television tournament that is broadcast on NBCSN's Curling Night in America.

Leagues
Through the curling season Duluth Curling Club members participate in leagues including Men's, Women's, Open (mixed men and women), Juniors, and Instructional.

National and international championships
The Duluth Curling Club has hosted two World Championships, the US Olympic Trials, and numerous National events. Two DCC members have been inducted into the Curling Hall of Fame, for service to the sport. Numerous members have participated in and won State and National Championships over the years, and even a few World and Olympic Championships.  The Men’s Club Championship has been contested annually since at least 1909

Bonspiels
The Duluth Curling Club hosts many bonspiels throughout the season as fundraisers or tour sanctioned events:
Turkey Spiel (Members only)
Ladies Fun Spiel
Elizabeth Busche Memorial Junior Bonspiel
Bruce Bennett Men’s Over 40
USWCA All American
Hoops Open Bonspiel
Dunlop Mixed Bonspiel
House of Hearts Charity Bonspiel

Notable members
John Shuster
Tyler George
John Landsteiner

 Wally Gilbert

References

External links
Duluth Curling Club

1891 establishments in Minnesota
Curling clubs in the United States
Sports in Duluth, Minnesota
Curling in Minnesota